The 2014 Open de Rennes was a professional tennis tournament played on hard courts. It was the ninth edition of the tournament which was part of the 2014 ATP Challenger Tour. It took place in Rennes, France between 6 and 12 October 2014.

Singles main-draw entrants

Seeds

 1 Rankings are as of September 29, 2014.

Other entrants
The following players received wildcards into the singles main draw:
  Paul-Henri Mathieu
  Tristan Lamasine
  Enzo Couacaud
  Marc Gicquel

The following players used protected ranking to get into the singles main draw:
  Steve Darcis

The following players received entry from the qualifying draw:
  Tim Pütz
  Robin Haase
  Karen Khachanov
  Martin Fischer

Champions

Singles

 Steve Darcis def.  Nicolas Mahut, 6–2, 6–4

Doubles

 Tobias Kamke /  Philipp Marx def.  František Čermák /  Jonathan Erlich, 3–6, 6–2, [10–3]

External links
Official Website

Open de Rennes
Open de Rennes
2014 in French tennis